Daishin may refer to:

, Japanese classical violinist
, Japanese baseball player
Daishin Noboru (1937 – 2012), Japanese sumo wrestler
Daishin-ji, a Buddhist temple in Tokyo, Japan

Japanese masculine given names